Shukria Tabassum was the daughter of Ramazan Ali from Afghanistan born in Jaghori District of Ghazni Province. She was killed in the 2015 Zabul massacre.

Childhood and murder
Shukria Tabassum belonged to the Hazara ethnic group of Afghanistan. She was a student who at the age of 9 was kidnapped by the Islamic State (IS) in Afghanistan. During a journey from Jaghori to Quetta, Pakistan all seven ethnic Hazara passengers were captured in the valley of Zabul, Afghanistan.

Tabassum and six other passengers who were kidnapped were later executed. After they were killed, the kidnappers (known as IS members) dropped their bodies in a hospital in Zabul Valley. The other Hazaras received the news and reached to Zabul to collect their bodies.

Eponymous movement

After the execution of all seven kidnap victims, around 20,000 demonstrators gathered in Kabul to protest against government policies and the administration, in a series of protests called the Tabassum movement, named in memory of Shukria Tabassum.

See also 
 List of kidnappings

References 

2006 births
2010s missing person cases
2015 deaths
21st-century Afghan people
21st-century Afghan women
Afghan terrorism victims
Date of birth missing
Female murder victims
Formerly missing people
Hazara children
Kidnapped Afghan people
Kidnapped children
Missing person cases in Afghanistan
Murdered Afghan children
People from Ghazni Province
People killed by the Islamic State of Iraq and the Levant
People murdered in Afghanistan
Violence against women in Afghanistan